Ewa Kassala is a Polish writer, journalist, trainer, social action creator, self-presentation and public image creator, screenwriter and a host of television programmes, conferences, conventions and sessions, mainly for women. Some of her books have been published under the name Dorota Stasikowska-Woźniak.

Career 
She has also been a coordinator of social and research projects on both countrywide and global scale, a chairwoman in the national thematic system EQUAL; Silesian voivode's public plenipotentiary for the Equality of Genders, a member in the Coordinate Norwegian Committee for Financial Movements. She has founded and led, inter alia, Soroptimist International Silesian Club Nike and Silesian Centre of Equal Chances. She has also brought to Poland the public benefit organization Dress for Success, which she now oversees.

Awards and honours
 "Businesswoman of the Year" 
 "Chapeau bas" 
 Soroptimist International "Steel Carnation" 
 "Queen of Charity"

Selected works 
"Cleopatra", Oficyna Wydawnicza Leksykon, 1995, 
"Portrait of woman in the age of perdition", Videograf II, 1999,  
"Mandrake", Burda Książki, 2014, 
"Cleopatra's Passions", Royal Hawaiian Press, 2017, 
"Divine Nefertiti", Royal Hawaiian Press, 2017 
Hatshepsut", Wydawnictwo Sonia Draga, 2017,

Guidebooks
"Public speeches and creation of image", Śląskie Centrum Równych Szans, 2005, 
"How to be a Modern Lady", Polski Dom Kreacji, 2009, 
"Guidebook of a Modern Witch", Novum, 2000, 
"Dress for Success", G+J Książki, 2013,

References

Year of birth missing (living people)
Living people
20th-century Polish women writers
21st-century Polish women writers
Pseudonymous women writers
20th-century Polish novelists
21st-century Polish novelists
20th-century pseudonymous writers
21st-century pseudonymous writers